Aliabad (also Romanized as ‘Alīābād; also known as ‘Alīābād-e Rameshāyeh) is a village in Shabkhus Lat Rural District, Rankuh District, Amlash County, Gilan Province, Iran. At the 2006 census, its population was 198, in 50 families.

References 

Populated places in Amlash County